Let It All In is the sixth and final studio album by English rock band I Am Kloot. Like the previous one, this record was produced by Guy Garvey and Craig Potter of the band Elbow.  It was released on 21 January 2013. On 27 January, the album debuted at #10 in the UK Albums Chart and at #1 in the Official Record Store Chart.

On 14 January 2013, the album began streaming for free on the guardian.co.uk website. Later, at an unknown time, the widget that provided the stream stopped working.

The first single promoting the album, "Hold Back the Night", had its radio premiere and a video premiere on 1 October 2012. However, the video clip "leaked out" a day early (on 30 September 2012).

The second single from the album is the song "These Days Are Mine". The music video for it was released on 26 November 2012. The single was released on 14 January 2013.

The video for "Some Better Day" features John Simm and was released on 8 February 2013.

Before the release of Let Them All In, I Am Kloot asked a British poet, Simon Armitage, to write a few words about this album. Those liner notes are only to be found on the LP edition.

"Bullets" 
In the opening track ("Bullets") John Bramwell sings with a slight lisp. It's the result of an accident that occurred during the time the album was recorded and in which the singer lost some of his lower teeth. In some interviews, Bramwell says that it was a speed-boating accident somewhere in Southern France, while in others he calls this version of events a myth.

Track listing 
The track listing for the album is as follows:

The Japanese edition of Let It All In includes two additional tracks (#11, #12): "Too Late" and "To Send My Love to You (demo)". Both were also published as b-sides of the singles from this album (see below).

Singles

References

External links 
 I Am Kloot – Let It All In: exclusive album stream on guardian.co.uk
 These Days Are Mine (Dave Clarke remix) free stream on SoundCloud
 the liner notes by Simon Armitage (unsigned)
 the official web site of the album Let It All In
 the official web site with the sampler of the album Let It All In

2013 albums
I Am Kloot albums